Wagner VI is a pseudocylindrical whole Earth map projection. Like the Robinson projection, it is a compromise projection, not having any special attributes other than a pleasing, low distortion appearance. This elongation results in proper preservation of shapes near the equator but slightly more distortion overall. The aspect ratio of this projection is 2:1, as formed by the ratio of the equator to the central meridian. This matches the ratio of Earth’s equator to any meridian.

The Wagner VI is defined by:

Inverse formula:

See also

 List of map projections
 Cartography
 Kavrayskiy VII projection
 Robinson projection

References

Map projections